Kenneth F. Harper (born January 15, 1931) was an American politician in the state of Kentucky. He served in the Kentucky House of Representatives from 1962 to 1968 and from 1982 to 1994, as a Republican. Harper also served as Secretary of State of Kentucky from 1971 to 1972. He is a United States Air Force veteran of the Korean War.

Harper attended the Kentucky Military Institute and University of Kentucky.

References

1931 births
Living people
Politicians from Covington, Kentucky
Secretaries of State of Kentucky
Republican Party members of the Kentucky House of Representatives
University of Kentucky alumni